The Kings' Clash (in Portuguese Choque-Rei) is the name given to Palmeiras and São Paulo football rivalry matches. It is contested between two very big, classic football clubs. The derby dates back to 1930. The tension between both clubs and fanbases is extremely fierce, and it is considered the third biggest Derby in the city of São Paulo, only behind the Clássico Majestoso and the Paulista Derby.

São Paulo has 114 wins and Palmeiras also has 114 wins. The number of drawn matches between the two is 111, describing an equalized encounter. In matches counting for the Brazilian Serie A, however, Palmeiras has more victories than São Paulo, reaching 25 wins over 17 from São Paulo, and with other 32 draws.

Incidents
On 20 August 1995, tragedy struck in the Derby, at the end of the Supercopa São Paulo de Futebol Júnior, a Brazilian juniors football cup. In the match, at Pacaembu Stadium, Rogério conceded a goal from Palmeiras in the golden goal segment, winning the title. Supporters group Mancha Verde invaded the field to celebrate the title, provoking the São Paulo (Independente) supporters. Enraged, the São Paulo supporters tore down the gate and armed themselves with stones and pieces of wood and began the conflict. The few policemen who were at the stadium were unable to control the fight. After nine minutes of the conflict, the cops had reinforcement and stabilized the situation. After the fight, some areas in the stadium was badly damaged. According with the police, 102 people were injured (80 supporters and 22 cops) and a 16-year-old São Paulo supporter died.

Statistics

General
339 Matches
114 Wins – Palmeiras
114 Wins – São Paulo
111 Draws
Palmeiras goals: 444
São Paulo goals: 439
Last Match: Palmeiras 0–0 São Paulo (Campeonato Brasileiro, 16 October 2022)

Campeonato Brasileiro
including Torneio Roberto Gomes Pedrosa and Taça Brasil
74 Matches
25 Wins – Palmeiras
17 Wins – São Paulo
32 Draws
Palmeiras goals: 92
São Paulo goals: 79
Last Match: Palmeiras 0–0 São Paulo (Campeonato Brasileiro, 16 October 2022)

Other
Largest victories:
Palmeiras 0–6 São Paulo (March 26, 1939)
Palmeiras greatest win:
Palmeiras 5–0 São Paulo (May 19, 1965)
São Paulo greatest win:
Palmeiras 0–6 São Paulo (March 26, 1939)
Most goals scored in a match:
Palmeiras 2–6 São Paulo (October 3, 1981) – 8 goals

Highest scorers
Only for Campeonato Brasileiro

William – Palmeiras: 4 Goals
Luís Fabiano – São Paulo: 4 Goals
Müller – São Paulo, Palmeiras: 3 Goals (2 for São Paulo and 1 for Palmeiras)
Marcelo Ramos – São Paulo: 3 Goals
Edmundo – Palmeiras: 3 Goals
Pita – São Paulo: 3 Goals
Mirandinha – São Paulo: 2 Goals
Jorge Mendonça – Palmeiras: 2 Goals
Mendonça – Palmeiras: 2 Goals
Edu Manga – Palmeiras: 2 Goals
Mário Tilico – São Paulo: 2 Goals
Evair – Palmeiras: 2 Goals
Oséas – Palmeiras: 2 Goals
Zinho – Palmeiras: 2 Goals
Tuta – Palmeiras: 2 Goals
Vágner Love – Palmeiras: 2 Goals
Cicinho – São Paulo: 2 Goals
Amoroso – São Paulo: 2 Goals
Ricardo Oliveira – São Paulo: 2 Goals
Marcinho – Palmeiras: 2 Goals
Fernandão – São Paulo: 2 Goals
Dagoberto – São Paulo: 2 Goals

Most appearances
Only for Campeonato Brasileiro

Rogério Ceni – São Paulo: 24 Matches
Marcos – Palmeiras: 11 Matches
Zetti – São Paulo: 10 Matches

Major attendances
Attendance: 115,000 (Palmeiras 0–1 São Paulo, June 27, 1971), Estádio Cícero Pompeu de Toledo (Morumbi) – Campeonato Paulista
Attendance: 112,016 (Palmeiras 0–0 São Paulo, June 17, 1979), Estádio Cícero Pompeu de Toledo (Morumbi) – Campeonato Paulista

Titles comparison

 Note: Although the Intercontinental Cup and the FIFA Club World Cup are officially different tournaments, in Brazil they are treated many times as the same tournament.

League matches
These are only the league matches, club name in bold indicate win. The score is given at full-time (T), in the goals columns the goalscorer and time when goal was scored is noted.

Copa Libertadores matches

Head-to-head results

References

External links
 Futpédia

Brazilian football derbies
Sociedade Esportiva Palmeiras
São Paulo FC